Euchrysops kabrosae is a butterfly in the family Lycaenidae. It is found in Kenya, Uganda and Tanzania. The habitat consists of rocky hillsides in dry, mountainous country.

Subspecies
Euchrysops kabrosae kabrosae (western Kenya, eastern Uganda)
Euchrysops kabrosae rosieae Congdon, Kielland & Collins, 1998 (northern Tanzania)

References

Butterflies described in 1906
Euchrysops